The Dodge Charger is a model of automobile marketed by Dodge in various forms over seven generations since 1966. 

The first Charger was a show car in 1964. A 1965 Charger II concept car resembled the 1966 production version.

The Charger has been built on three different platforms in various sizes. In the United States, the Charger nameplate has been used on subcompact hatchbacks, full-size sedans, muscle cars, and personal luxury coupes. The current version is a four-door sedan.

Background
The 1966 Charger was an effort by Dodge to produce an upscale, upsized pony car. American Motors had already built a very similar vehicle in 1965, the Marlin, which was positioned as a personal car, an emerging market niche.

Mercury was successful in its execution in introducing the upscale Cougar, which was both larger and more refined than the Ford Mustang that pioneered the pony car concept in 1964.

The Charger was positioned as a more expensive and luxurious coupe aiming at the market segment represented by the Oldsmobile Toronado and Ford Thunderbird market segment instead of the other muscle cars.

First generation: 1966–1967

The Charger was introduced during the 1966 model year. It featured a two-door fastback body design and a four bucket seat interior. The intermediate-sized Charger shared components with the Coronet that also used the Chrysler B platform. The base engine was a  V8 with a three-speed manual and an optional automatic transmission. Larger and more powerful engines were also available such as the 426 cubic inch Hemi V8. Sales were low.

Second generation: 1968–1970

The Charger was redesigned for 1968, and an initial 35,000 units were slated for production. The demand was high and 96,100 Chargers were actually produced. Based on the Chrysler B platform, the model years received various cosmetic changes to the exterior and interior including: an undivided grill, rounded tail lights, and hidden headlights. The powertrains were carried over from 1967, but the  slant-6 became available in mid-1968. The Charger was not successful in stock car racing such as NASCAR. A more aerodynamic shape formed the Charger 500 model that became the basis for the 1969 Charger Daytona.

Third generation: 1971–1974

The third generation Charger was introduced for the 1971 model year. Chrysler's B platform was modified to meet new emissions and safety regulations. Available in six different packages with cosmetic changes that include: a split grill, semi-fastback rear window, and a ducktail spoiler. The 1973 and 1974 Chargers were similar to the 1971s, with minor differences in the grille and headlamps. The 1973 and 1974 Chargers also wore new quarter windows, which were larger and shaped differently than the quarter windows seen on the 1971 and 1972 models. The increase in sales was primarily due to the elimination of the Dodge Coronet two-door, which meant Dodge offered the two-door intermediate-size body style only as the Charger (although the Coronet two-door would reappear in 1975).

The name Charger was also used in Brazil as a performance model based on the Dart (A-Body) (1971–80).

Fourth generation: 1975–1978

The 1975 model year Charger continued as a B body car and was restyled in an effort by Dodge to move the model into the growing personal luxury car market segment. In 1978 Dodge added the Magnum to that segment. A Daytona model fourth-generation Charger featured stripes that ran along the length of the car.

Fifth generation: 1982–1987

The Charger returned in 1981½ as a front-wheel drive subcompact hatchback coupe, available with a five-speed manual or three-speed automatic transmission. This economy-type model was similar to the Dodge Omni 024, but slightly larger. The Charger was available with a 2.2 L SOHC engine or a turbocharged 2.2 L SOHC. The turbo was available only with the manual transmission, unlike in the Dodge Daytona. The engine was not intercooled and used a small t3 Garrett turbo. In 1985, the electronics were updated, but the power output was the same. In 1986, the electronics were further updated.

Sixth generation: 2006–2010 (LX)

After a 20 year absence, Dodge reintroduced the Charger in 2005 for the 2006 model year as a Chrysler LX platform-based four-door sedan. Although the 1999 Charger concept car also featured four doors, it otherwise shared little with the 2006 production model.

Initially, the Charger was available in SE, SXT, R/T, R/T with Road/Track Performance Group, Police, and Daytona R/T versions. For the first time, a V6 engine was available, as was all-wheel drive (AWD). All-wheel drive was first only available on the R/T package. However, from 2009 onwards, all-wheel drive was also an option for the SE and SXT versions.

The basic SE model included a 2.7 L V6 engine, 5-speed automatic transmission with "AutoStick" manual shifting feature, 17-inch wheels, air conditioning, all-speed traction control, as well as ABS and electronic stability control, a CD player, tilt and telescoping steering column, power locks/mirrors/windows, and remote keyless entry. Additional features and trims were available, including the Charger R/T with a 5.7 L Hemi V8 mated to a 5-speed automatic transmission. A multiple-displacement system that allowed it to save fuel by running on only four cylinders when cruising was also featured in the V8.

Performance was the focus of the Charger SRT8 equipped with a 6.1 L Hemi engine mated to a 5-speed automatic, as well as conveniences such as an eight-way power front passenger seat, automatic climate control, unique grille and rear spoiler, body-color interior trim, special front fascia and engine cover, larger exhaust tips, performance steering gear, heated front seats with perforated suede inserts, power-adjustable pedals, and unique colors and exterior trim. An optional Road/Track package offered ten additional horsepower, a GPS navigation system, a 322-watt audio system, a sunroof, and a rear-seat DVD entertainment system and radio.

Seventh generation (LD): 2011–present

The Charger received an improved interior and new exterior styling for 2011. This included new side scoops along both front and rear doors, more angular headlights, aggressive new grille styling, and a more defined and aerodynamic shape overall. Most notably, the back end adopted a more modern wrap-around LED tail light spanning nearly the entire trunk width. Driver visibility was improved by more than 15%, addressing complaints from previous years. The side and rear styling cues are reminiscent of the 1968-1970 models.

The 4-speed automatic transmission was replaced with the 5-speed A580 auto.

The SRT-8 was not produced for the 2011 model year.

The 2012 year brought a new 8-speed automatic transmission to the V6 model. This year also saw the return of the SRT-8 to the model lineup. AWD was also added to the V6, making AWD available on all but the SRT-8 model. 

For the 2012 – 2018 years, the Super Bee platform (Later called Scat Pack 15+) was available, using features seen in regular SRT-8 models with accessories and badges reminiscent of the 60s and 70s muscle car.

The 2014 Pursuit model no longer included chrome exhaust tip extensions, as they often scraped during maneuvers over medians.

For 2015, the Charger received significant exterior styling updates. Most notably, the new front end featured new LED lights and a more aerodynamic nose that was less angled and featured a noticeable curve around the headlight housing. Suspensions, interiors, and brakes were also redesigned.

The 2017 model had an upgrade to the 8.4-inch navigation/display system and was restyled due to issues with the previous system.

Except for Charger Pursuit (through 2020), all models came standard with the eight-speed automatic transmission. In December of 2014, the AWD Charger Pursuit appeared, and the V8 R/T AWD model disappeared. Sales of the AWD Pursuit increased.

For 2020, the Charger Hellcat comes standard with the "widebody" to accommodate an improved tire/suspension package. Dodge also added a new trim for 2020 called the SRT Hellcat Redeye. The Hellcat Redeye comes standard with the  V8 engine. The 2020 Charger Pursuit was only available in the RWD V6 and AWD V8 models. Beginning in 2021, the roles reversed, with the V6 Pursuit now equipped with AWD and the 850RE 8-spd auto. The V8 Pursuit was RWD with the 8HP70. In 2022, several police models were dropped, including the V8-RWD Charger Pursuit, the V6-AWD Durango Pursuit, and both Durango SSV models. That leaves police with the V6-AWD Charger and V8-AWD Durango Pursuit models, and 4×4 1500/2500/3500 Ram SSV models, through 2023.

In 2022, the Street and Racing Technology team produced the "Jailbreak Edition", based on the 2020 Hellcat Redeye Widebody. SRT added ten extra horsepower from the stock Hellcat Redeye, which totals 807. The idea behind it was for the user to be able to customize the Charger through the factory as if there was a "Jailbreak". The Inside offers different options for the floor mats, color of the leather seats ,logos ,sound system, headliner. The exterior of the Charger has the options to add racing stripes to differ from the Challenger. Users have the option of changing the color of the car, brake calipers, wheels, badges, exhaust tips, and an option of adding the SRT spoiler.

In January 2022, Dodge announced that the Hemi V8 Charger (5.7L, 6.4L, and 6.2L) will be retired at the end of the 2023 model year.

Future

The Charger Daytona SRT is a coupe that was introduced as a concept in August 2022. According to Dodge, it will go on sale in 2024.

Other models
 Dodge Charger Daytona – the name given to three different modified Dodge Chargers built on the B-body and LX platforms
 Dodge Super Bee
 Shelby Charger
 Dodge Charger R/T (1999 concept)
 Dodge Charger Daytona SRT Concept – a battery electric concept car

See also
 1971–1976 Chrysler Valiant Charger – short wheelbase Valiant coupe produced by Chrysler Australia
 The General Lee – Dodge Charger used in the television series The Dukes of Hazzard
 Dodge Challenger – a 1970s muscle car, revived in the 2000s

References

External links

 
 
 A history of the pre-2000s Dodge Charger
 A history of Dodge Chargers by Edmunds.com
 

Charger